Abel Hill is a mountain in Dukes County, Massachusetts. Washaqua Hill is located east-southeast and Ridge Hill is located northeast of Abel Hill.

References

Mountains of Massachusetts
Mountains of Dukes County, Massachusetts